Penny Dunbabin (née Gray; 12 October 1958 – 21 May 2014) was an Australian field hockey player. She competed in the women's tournament at the 1984 Summer Olympics.

References

External links
 

1958 births
2014 deaths
Australian female field hockey players
Olympic field hockey players of Australia
Field hockey players at the 1984 Summer Olympics
Sportspeople from Launceston, Tasmania
20th-century Australian women